The Fountain House is located in the borough of Doylestown, Pennsylvania, in the central commercial district.  The four-story building is steeped in local history and is a major landmark of the Bucks County area. It was added to the National Register of Historic Places in 1972.

History 

The Fountain House was one of seven taverns in pre-revolutionary Doylestown.  It was constructed by William Doyle, the founder of Doylestown. The first part of the building was constructed in 1758. Owned by a Tory during the American Revolutionary War, it was seized by government authorities and sold at auction. Throughout the 19th century, The Fountain House hosted, in addition to a tavern, the first Doylestown post office, and a stagecoach line connecting Philadelphia and Easton. The Fountain House was entered into the National Register of Historic Places in 1972.

Construction 
The Fountain House, built primarily in the Victorian style, has gone through a number of changes.
 1758: Original stone structure built
 1830: Third story added
 1849: Two additional structures built on either side
 1876: Gabled Roof replaced with Mansard Roof
 1971: Restored

Current occupants 
Currently, The Fountain House hosts several business occupants, primarily the Starbucks which occupies the entire first floor. Several law offices and apartments are located on the second and third floors. It is a major social gathering location in Doylestown. The town's Christmas Tree is placed in front of the building annually.

References

External links 
Living Places
Photographic Tour of Bucks County, Doylestown

Houses completed in 1758
Houses on the National Register of Historic Places in Pennsylvania
Houses in Bucks County, Pennsylvania
National Register of Historic Places in Bucks County, Pennsylvania
Individually listed contributing properties to historic districts on the National Register in Pennsylvania